Terry Bernard Coner (born November 7, 1964) is an American basketball coach and former professional player. He was named Alabama Mr. Basketball while attending Phillips High School in Birmingham, Alabama. Coner played college basketball for the Alabama Crimson Tide for four seasons. At the conclusion of his collegiate career, it was determined he had been collegiately ineligible due to making contact with an agent while still enrolled.

Coner was selected by the Atlanta Hawks as the 44th overall pick of the 1987 NBA draft. He spent his first professional season with the Savannah Spirits of the Continental Basketball Association. Coner then played professionally in Argentina and Europe.

Coner became the head coach of the boys' basketball team at Altamont School in 2015 after he had served as a long-time assistant. He became an assistant coach at Pinson Valley High School in 2020 where his son plays on the team.

Career statistics

College

|-
| style="text-align:left;"| 1983–84
| style="text-align:left;"| Alabama
| 28 || 8 || 18.3 || .455 || – || .789 || .9 || 2.4 || .5 || .1 || 5.7
|-
| style="text-align:left;"| 1984–85
| style="text-align:left;"| Alabama
| 33 || 33 || 36.2 || .521 || – || .773 || 2.2 || 5.6 || 2.2 || .3 || 11.8
|-
| style="text-align:left;"| 1985–86
| style="text-align:left;"| Alabama
| 32 || 32 || 35.6 || .485 || – || .716 || 2.8 || 7.5 || 1.7 || .3 || 10.9
|-
| style="text-align:left;"| 1986–87
| style="text-align:left;"| Alabama
| 27 || 24 || 31.6 || .505 || .000 || .850 || 2.7 || 6.4 || 1.3 || .2 || 11.7
|- class="sortbottom"
| style="text-align:center;" colspan="2"| Career
| 120 || 97 || 30.9 || .497 || .000 || .780 || 2.2 || 5.5 || 1.5 || .2 || 10.1

References

External links
College statistics
Argentine league stats
 Dutch league stats
 Estonian league stats

1964 births
Living people
20th-century African-American sportspeople
21st-century African-American sportspeople
Amsterdam Basketball players
African-American basketball coaches
African-American basketball players
Alabama Crimson Tide men's basketball players
American men's basketball coaches
American men's basketball players
American expatriate basketball people in Argentina
American expatriate basketball people in Austria
American expatriate basketball people in Estonia
American expatriate basketball people in the Netherlands
Atlanta Hawks draft picks
Basketball coaches from Alabama
Basketball players from Alabama
BC Kalev/Cramo players
DAS Delft players
Estudiantes de Bahía Blanca basketball players
Feyenoord Basketball players
Gimnasia y Esgrima de Comodoro Rivadavia basketball players
High school basketball coaches in Alabama
Olimpo basketball players
Pensacola Tornados (1986–1991) players
Point guards
Savannah Spirits players